"Not Guilty" is a song by English rock musician George Harrison from his 1979 album George Harrison. He wrote the song in 1968 following the Beatles' Transcendental Meditation course in India with Maharishi Mahesh Yogi, an activity that he had led the group into undertaking. The lyrics serve as a response to the recrimination Harrison received from his bandmates John Lennon and Paul McCartney in the aftermath to the group's public falling out with the Maharishi, and as the Beatles launched their multimedia company Apple Corps. The band recorded the song amid the tensions that characterised the sessions for their 1968 double LP The Beatles (also known as the "White Album"). The track was completed in August 1968 but not included on the release.

Harrison revisited "Not Guilty" in early 1978, shortly after participating in the Rutles' television satire of the Beatles' history, All You Need Is Cash. In contrast to the atmosphere surrounding the song's creation, this period was one of personal contentment for Harrison, who enjoyed the opportunity to debunk the myths surrounding his former band. The musical arrangement similarly differs in mood from the 1968 version; where the latter features distorted electric guitars and harpsichord, Harrison's version reflects his adoption of a mellow jazz-pop style. The other musicians on the recording include Neil Larsen and Willie Weeks.

"Not Guilty" was known to be a Beatles outtake but the song was unheard by the public until the release of Harrison's 1979 album. The Beatles' version continued to be the subject of speculation among collectors. An edit of the band's recording was prepared for the aborted Sessions album in 1984 and became available on bootlegs before its official release on the Beatles' Anthology 3 outtakes compilation in 1996. The full version of the track, together with Harrison's May 1968 demo of the song, appears on the 50th Anniversary Edition box-set release of The Beatles.

Background and inspiration

George Harrison wrote "Not Guilty" in 1968 following the Beatles' highly publicised spiritual retreat in Rishikesh, India, where they studied Transcendental Meditation under Maharishi Mahesh Yogi. Harrison had led the Beatles' interest in meditation and Indian culture, influencing their audience and musical peers, but the band's falling out with the Maharishi in April 1968 became the source of public embarrassment. Ringo Starr and Paul McCartney had each left the ashram early and returned to England, with McCartney more interested in attending to the band's new Apple Corps business venture. Harrison and John Lennon stayed on, only to then depart hurriedly after hearing of alleged impropriety between the Maharishi and a female student. The Rishikesh sojourn was the Beatles' last extracurricular activity as a group and was followed by a divergence of opinion between Lennon, McCartney and Harrison that lasted until the band's break-up in April 1970. In his 1980 autobiography, I, Me, Mine, Harrison says that "Not Guilty" addresses "Paul-John-Apple-Rishikesh-Indian friends, etc."

Rather than return to England with Lennon, Harrison extended his time away by visiting his mentor Ravi Shankar in Madras. When he returned to London in late April, according to Apple press officer Derek Taylor, Harrison "reacted with real horror" at the extravagance of Apple's operation. The company had taken out print advertisements inviting any budding artist to submit their creative ideas. The London offices were inundated with submissions, almost all of which were ignored, along with crowds of eccentrics responding to the Beatles' invitation. In a 1987 interview with Timothy White for Musician magazine, Harrison referred to "the grief I was catching" from Lennon and McCartney post-India. He explained the message behind the song: "I said I wasn't guilty of getting in the way of their career. I said I wasn't guilty of leading them astray in our going to Rishikesh to see the Maharishi. I was sticking up for myself …"

The Rishikesh sojourn also resulted in Harrison's emergence as a prolific songwriter. "Not Guilty" was one of several guitar-based compositions from this period, coinciding with Harrison's re-engagement with his main instrument after two years of dedicated sitar study under Shankar. The full extent of this productivity was hidden until his 1970 solo album, All Things Must Pass, however, as Lennon and McCartney continued to dominate the Beatles' songwriting. In author Peter Doggett's description, the band's stay in Rishikesh marked the end of a period when Harrison's championing of Indian culture had guided the Beatles' musical and philosophical direction. He adds that the "old balance of power was uneasily resumed", as Harrison had to push to have his songs included on the group's albums, and Lennon, further to their self-produced 1967 TV film Magical Mystery Tour, continued to resent McCartney's attempts to manage their career.

Composition
The key of "Not Guilty" is E minor. It contains combined verse and choruses; each of the three verse-chorus sections begins and ends with the song's title phrase. The composition includes a guitar riff that author Alan Clayson views as distinctive and "low-down", and closes with an instrumental coda. It also features syncopation, half-bars, and, on the Beatles recording, a guitar solo followed by a change in time signature from 4/4 to six bars in 3/8.

Musicologist Walter Everett highlights the song's musical form as an example of "the composer's typically outlandish chord juxtapositions", which in this case reveals "a new level of sophistication similar to jazz methodology". He says that while E minor is the main key, A minor is tonicised in the start of the verses and is further suggested with a surprising G–Dm8–Dm7–E7 chord sequence. Following the final chord in that sequence, he hears the Gm chord as "confident and loudly protesting", and contextually derived via an "unprecedented use of mixture from the Phrygian mode (thus the chord's B [note]) into A pentatonic minor".

"Not Guilty" follows Harrison's 1967 song "Only a Northern Song" as a statement of his dissatisfaction in the Beatles. Everett describes the lyrics as a "defense against the tyranny of his songwriting comrades". Harrison refers to his bandmates as seeking to "steal the day"; he recognises his place and vows not to "[get] underneath your feet". In the third verse, he promises not to "upset the Apple cart", as "I only want what I can get". With regard to Rishikesh and the Maharishi, he denies any responsibility for the others' disappointment with the experience. He denies leading the group "astray on the road to Mandalay" and "making friends with every Sikh".

Beatles version

Esher demo
In May 1968, Harrison taped an acoustic demo of the song at his home, Kinfauns in Esher. This and other demos of the band's new material were part of their preparation for recording the double LP The Beatles, also known as the "White Album". On the tapes, the song follows a group performance of Harrison's tribute to meditation, "Sour Milk Sea", after which he refers to "Not Guilty" as "a jazz number" that would make "a good rocker". Having long been available on bootleg compilations, the Esher demo was issued in 2018 on the White Album's 50th Anniversary box set.

Studio recording

Basic track
The Beatles recorded "Not Guilty" at EMI Studios (now Abbey Road Studios) in London in August 1968. The recording was produced by George Martin and engineered by Ken Scott. The song was difficult to learn due to its time signature changes. During the first 18 takes on 7 August, the band focused only on the introduction, before going on to tape a further 27 takes that night. On 8 August, they first attended to a technical problem on the recording of their forthcoming single, "Hey Jude", and then resumed work on "Not Guilty". The group recorded a total of 101 takes over the two sessions, although only 21 of these attempts were complete performances, before settling on take 99 as a satisfactory basic track.

Initial takes included keyboard accompaniment from an electric piano, but this was replaced by a harpsichord for the 8 August session. The instruments used on the basic track were therefore electric guitar, harpsichord, bass and drums. Although author Ian MacDonald says Harrison or Lennon played the harpsichord part, Everett credits Lennon, who also played the instrument on "All You Need Is Love" the previous year. The recording marked the first time that Harrison used his Gibson Les Paul guitar known as "Lucy", which was a gift from his friend Eric Clapton.

Overdubs
The band recorded overdubs onto take 99 on 9 August, with Starr adding further drums and McCartney augmenting his bass part. Much of the six-and-a-half-hour session was dedicated to Harrison's lead guitar part; for this, he chose to play in the control room while his amplifier was recorded in an echo chamber. On 12 August, Harrison overdubbed his lead vocal, trying different areas of the studio in an effort to achieve the sound he was after. He again settled on the control room with, in Scott's description, "everything coming back through the speakers to give it more of a live theater-type feel or club feel". Lennon and McCartney experimented with harmony vocals on some parts of the song, but Harrison was unsatisfied. Scott told journalist Marshall Terrill in 2012 that the recording was problematic because "George wasn't feeling it. It was his song and he wasn't feeling it. He could not get a vocal that he was happy with. He couldn't get even into sort of the mood of singing it, that's why we tried different ways of him singing it …"

Harrison then spent more time recording guitar at live performance levels. A mono mix, titled RM1, of the completed track was carried out that same day. In the description of Guitar Worlds editors, Harrison's playing on the song has a "sinewy" quality and a "sizzling tone" made more effective by being performed at full volume. Author Simon Leng writes that the recording "might have passed for grunge", with its "phased vocals and ... pseudo-harpsichord under attack from George's heavily distorted guitars and fierce riff". He adds that the lead guitar is "spiky-rough in a way Harrison would rarely approach again". Following his pioneering backwards-recorded guitar solo on "I'm Only Sleeping", in 1966, Harrison's use of reverse echo-chamber effect on "Not Guilty" marked the last time the Beatles used backwards audio on one of their recordings.

MacDonald cites "Not Guilty" as an example of how Harrison's contributions to the White Album were "stymied" by the divisive atmosphere that characterised the sessions, which included a lack of collaboration between the band members. After Harrison departed for a short holiday in Greece, the other Beatles resumed recording on 20 August with tensions running high; Lennon and Starr completed overdubs on "Yer Blues" in one studio while McCartney recorded "Mother Nature's Son" alone in another. Two days later, by which point Harrison had returned to London, the acrimony that had been building within the group led to Starr walking out, intent on quitting the Beatles.

Exclusion from the White Album
According to Everett, "Not Guilty" was one of the last songs to be cut from the final running order of The Beatles. When announcing the release on 26 October, the NME listed "Not Guilty" among the possible tracks; Mal Evans, the Beatles' longtime aide, then wrote in the band's official fan magazine that it would not appear on the double album. Lennon admired the composition initially, but in Leng's view, with its "barbs about the Beatles", the song "was just a little too candid in airing the band's dirty laundry". Music journalist Mikal Gilmore similarly says that its exclusion was "perhaps because it was apparent to everybody that Harrison had aimed the song at Lennon and McCartney".

In its three-part study of the 1968 double album, in 2008, Goldmine magazine commented that the song's exclusion has long been one of the points of debate regarding the White Album. The writers said that some listeners find the content of the set "exquisitely balanced", while others contend that the Beatles "really should have added 'Not Guilty' to the brew". Increasingly marginalised from the Beatles' creative decision-making in 1968, Martin had favoured paring down the double LP to a single disc. Everett offers a 15-song running order in keeping with the producer's typical "preferences and constraints", in which he contends that Martin would have selected "Not Guilty", along with the Harrison compositions "While My Guitar Gently Weeps" and "Long, Long, Long".

The final take, numbered 102 (a reduction mix of take 99), was edited and remixed by Geoff Emerick in 1984 for the aborted Sessions album. After Harrison and McCartney filed affidavits criticising the "quality of the work", one of EMI's in-house cassettes of the Sessions recordings found its way to bootleggers, resulting in the Ultra Rare Trax bootlegs. "Not Guilty" appeared on the third volume in the Ultra Rare Trax series. It was officially released on Apple's outtakes compilation Anthology 3 in October 1996. Author and critic Richie Unterberger describes the Anthology 3 version of "Not Guilty" as a "bastardization" due to the editing out of a mid-song guitar solo and other features from the 1968 stereo mix. He adds that this treatment is "more roundly castigated than almost any other of the Anthology reconstructions". The unedited version of the track appears on the 50th Anniversary box set of the White Album.

George Harrison recording
According to author Robert Rodriguez, "Not Guilty" was "much-fabled" among Beatles fans by the late 1970s, since the song was known as a White Album outtake but had never been heard publicly. In their respective books on the Beatles published at that time, Nicholas Schaffner paired it with Lennon's "What's the New Mary Jane" as completed recordings that were known to have been left off the White Album, while Harry Castleman and Walter Podrazik wrote that, as far as collectors were aware, Harrison had taped "Not Guilty" with Clapton in summer 1968 before the Beatles attempted to record the song in March 1969.

In early 1978, while gathering song manuscripts for I, Me, Mine, Harrison rediscovered his Kinfauns demo of "Not Guilty". He decided to record the song again for what became his 1979 album George Harrison. At this time, he also revisited "Circles", another song he had demoed in Esher before the Beatles began recording the White Album, and he wrote "Here Comes the Moon" as a sequel to his 1969 Abbey Road composition "Here Comes the Sun".

The sessions took place between April and October 1978, and coincided with a period of domestic contentment for Harrison, during which he married his partner Olivia Arias and become a father for the first time, to son Dhani. In addition, Harrison had enjoyed participating in the Rutles' recent spoof of the Beatles' history, All You Need Is Cash, a film project that allowed him to debunk the myths that surrounded his former band. Harrison allowed his spiritual preoccupations to be satirised in the film as, following the Rutles' break-up, his character, Stig O'Hara, withdraws from the limelight to become a female flight attendant with Air India. Building on his reputation as the "Quiet Beatle", the identity of the alleged dead band member in the Paul is dead conspiracy theory was transferred to Stig, as the clues include the fact that he had not spoken since 1966.

Harrison recorded "Not Guilty" at his home studio, FPSHOT, in Henley, Oxfordshire, with Neil Larsen, Stevie Winwood, Willie Weeks and Andy Newmark among the backing musicians. Larsen played Rhodes piano, which serves as the main feature of the track, while Harrison exchanged the electric guitar arrangement from 1968 with acoustic parts. The recording also omits the section in 3/8 time, which had caused difficulty during the Beatles' attempts ten years before. Its mellow jazz arrangement ends with interplay between Harrison's scat singing and Weeks's bass. George Harrison was scheduled for release in December but an issue with the artwork delayed the process. On 15 December, Harrison accompanied Starr to the re-opening of the Star-Club in Hamburg, where the Beatles had regularly performed before achieving fame in 1963.

Harrison produced the track with Russ Titelman, a Warner Bros. Records staff producer whose other projects included the self-titled debut album by Rickie Lee Jones. Leng views Harrison's remake as typical of the singer's frame of mind on George Harrison, writing: "In complete contrast [to the Beatles' version], the 1979 reproduction is all shimmering cool and acoustic sea spray – here is a man looking back on events rather than being caught up in their heat." Leng describes the musical mood on the track as "a loose version of the Rickie Lee Jones or Paul Simon jazz-pop sound, dominated by phased electric piano and breathy vocals".

Release and reception

George Harrison was released on Dark Horse Records on 20 February 1979. "Not Guilty" appeared as the second track, sequenced between with "Love Comes to Everyone" and "Here Comes the Moon". The song was of particular interest to Harrison's audience, due to its reputation as a lost Beatles track. Harrison carried out limited promotion for the album, during which the speculation surrounding a possible Beatles reunion was a regular theme put forward by members of the media. At his press conference in Los Angeles, he suggested the former bandmates could meet for a cup of tea and televise the proceedings via satellite. He also denied that "Not Guilty" was aimed purely at McCartney, saying: "No, it's just about that period in 1968 ... there's a lot of comedy in it. You just have to look for it."

Peter Doggett writes that, in the context of its release, eleven years after the events of 1968, the song "gently satirised the global obsession with the past, and specifically the era that the Beatles allegedly epitomised". Doggett adds that although Harrison distanced himself from Beatles nostalgia in his promotional activities, he shared the public's interest in what Lennon might be doing during the latter's fourth year as a house-husband and stay-at-home father. In his Rolling Stone interview at this time, Harrison commented that he had not seen Lennon in the last two years and, after the recent changes in his own life, he understood his former bandmate's decision to remain out of the limelight.

The album received favourable reviews, particularly in the UK, where it was Harrison's best-received work since the early 1970s. Harry George of the NME welcomed the inclusion of "Not Guilty", saying "No Beatle who could take part in All You Need Is Cash can be all bad", and assumed that the reference to upsetting the "Apple cart" was a line from the Rutles. He described the song as a "tense soft-shoe shuffle", highlighting Larsen's electric piano, Weeks's "serpentine bass", and Harrison lyrics that offered "wit and composure" rather than "the whining defensiveness of yore". Writing in Melody Maker in 1979, E.J. Thribb also approved of Harrison's openness to being the target of Eric Idle's satire in the Rutles film. He named "Not Guilty" among the album's three most enjoyable songs, along with "Love Comes to Everyone" and "Blow Away", saying: "The chords roll and tumble, the melodies are good to chant, and the lyrics are simple but tell their story."

Personnel

Beatles version
According to Walter Everett:
 George Harrison – vocals, lead and rhythm guitars
 John Lennon – harpsichord
 Paul McCartney – bass
 Ringo Starr – drums

George Harrison version
According to Simon Leng:
 George Harrison – vocals, acoustic guitars
 Neil Larsen – electric piano
 Steve Winwood – keyboards
 Willie Weeks – bass
 Andy Newmark – drums
 Ray Cooper – conga

Notes

References

Sources

External links
 George Harrison – "Not Guilty" (Remastered 2004) on YouTube

1979 songs
George Harrison songs
Songs written by George Harrison
Song recordings produced by George Harrison
Song recordings produced by Russ Titelman
Music published by Oops Publishing and Ganga Publishing, B.V.
The Beatles and India
Songs about the Beatles
The Beatles Anthology
The Beatles songs
Song recordings produced by George Martin
British jazz songs
Vocal jazz songs